Events from the year 1868 in China.

Incumbents
 Tongzhi Emperor (8th year)
 Regent: Empress Dowager Cixi

Events 

 Yangzhou riot
 Burlingame Treaty, also known as the Burlingame-Seward Treaty of 1868, was a landmark treaty between the United States and Qing China, amending the Treaty of Tientsin, one of the unequal treaties, to establish formal friendly relations between the two nations, with the United States granting China the status of most favored nation in trade
 Nian Rebellion ends
 Remnants of resistance crushed by the combined forces of the government's troops and the Ever Victorious Army.
 Miao Rebellion (1854–73)
 Dungan Revolt (1862–77)
 Panthay Rebellion
 Tongzhi Restoration

Births 

 Huo Yuanjia in the Jinghai District
 Cai Yuanpei in Shaoxing
 Zhang Binglin in the Yuhang District
 Lu Haodong in Shanghai
 Huang Jinrong in Suzhou
 Lin Sen in Minhou County
 An Ti-sheng in Xianghe County

Deaths 

 Lai Wenguang in Yangzhou

References